The Greek identity Card ("identification card") is an official document of the Hellenic Republic, and the official national identification document for Greek citizens.

The Hellenic Police is the issuing authority, and possession of this document is mandatory for all Greek citizens 12 years of age and older. Citizens are always required to carry an identification document (namely a national identification card, a passport or a driving licence) and produce it upon request; failing to do so may result in the citizen's identification at the nearest police station. A passport is considered of equal value to the ID card, when certifying one's identity.

The ID card is a valid international travel document in Europe (except Belarus, Moldova, Russia, Ukraine and United Kingdom), to French overseas territories, Georgia and Turkey, and Montserrat (for 14 days in transit to a third country). Moreover, it is also used to identify a person of citizens in local and EU elections. ID cards are valid for 15 years and the bearer's name is also typed in Latin characters since 2000. Older ID cards, written in Greek characters only, were still valid and of equal value after 2000, provided that less than 20 years have passed since the issue date.

Military staff, as well as personnel of the police, fire brigade, coast guard, and intelligence services, carry special IDs issued by their sector, which is valid until retirement or conclusion of their services. This document is issued instead of the standard police-issued identity card, and can also be used as a travel document.

Description
The front side includes areas bearing the holder's signature, a black and white photograph of specific standards, the blood type (optional) and rhesus factor, as well as data of the identity card (number, place and date of issue, issuing authority). The back side includes the surname, first name and the name of the legal ascendant(s) of the identity card holder with Greek and Latin characters, as well as date and place of birth, height, the municipality in which the holder is registered and the authority issuing the identity card.

Before 2005 the ID card was mandatory for citizens over 14 years of age, and included data which were removed after 2005 due to privacy concerns or because they are no longer considered necessary for the purpose of identification of the person:
 Profession
 Religion
 Address
 Name of spouse
 Shape of head 
 The index fingerprint of the right hand
 Eye and hair color
 Citizenship

Technical characteristics
As a means of preventing counterfeiting, the paper on which it is printed bears a watermark, security thread and fluorescent overprint elements, but otherwise lacks security features (i.e. micro-chips, holograms) found in IDs of other countries.

New eID
Since 2010, Police Staff, Special Guards and Border Guards have high-security identity cards, that meet international standards. There had been unofficial talks of switching to a new ID type, one that could possibly bear the holder's social security number, a biometric photograph and other security features, sized down to that of a credit card. After the November 2015 Paris attacks, the Greek Ministry of Interior is now considering switching to the new ID type. On March 11, 2016 the Greek Ministry of Interior established a commission to create a plan for the new ID cards. Technical plans and draft legislation were prepared by June 2016. Based on reports the legislation will be enacted in 2017 followed by an open tendering process. Issuance of the new ID card will start in 2019. Now, in 2021, the government is running a competition to choose who will issue the new e-IDs

On 23 July 2017 the alternate Minister of Interior stated in an interview that an amendment has been filed with the Greek Parliament in order to amend the format with a ministerial decision. Pursuant to Article 158, Law 4483/2017 the Minister of Interior was given the authority to add data of the holder that were not defined in law and to set any necessary detail regarding ID cards. On 30 April 2018 a ministerial decision was published in the Greek Government Gazette. This decision set out the relevant procedures regarding issuance and the design of the new ID cards. Issuance is expected to start in the first semester of 2019. A process has been set out in order to change old ID cards in a 5 year period based on the holder's surname. A tender process was started on 18 April 2019 to select a company that will create the new Greek ID cards and other secure documents, as part of the Integrated Information System for Security Documents(IISSD).

Removal of religion 
On May 8, 2000 in an interview published in newspaper Eleftherotypia, Minister of Justice Michael Stathopoulos announced that the mandatory inclusion of religion on identity cards was contrary to law 2472/1997 for the protection of personal data. The Church of Greece immediately objected to the removal of religion from identity cards, organizing rallies, among which a rally in Thessaloniki on 14 June, in the presence of Archbishop Christodoulos. The Public Order Minister announced on 17 July that religion be removed from the new identities. On September 24, 2000 the church began collecting signatures in the parishes, seeking a referendum. The petition was completed in April 2001, gathering more than 3 million signatures. On August 29, 2001 Archbishop delivered to the President of the Hellenic Republic Konstantinos Stephanopoulos the signatures, but the president refused to receive them saying that "everybody has an obligation to comply with the laws of the State".

The State Council decided that the mandatory indication of religious affiliation on identity cards is not legal, while the Data Protection Authority also opposed to the optional reference to religion by adding the letters "XO" (Christian Orthodox - Χριστιανός Ορθόδοξος) following the signature of the bearer. The legality of collecting signatures was also questioned by the Minister of Justice Michael Stathopoulos.

See also
 National identity cards in the European Union

Sources 
 The first version of this article was based on :el:Δελτίο αστυνομικής ταυτότητας (Ελλάδα), contributed under CC-BY-SA.
 Greek Police - Identity Card Version (In Greek)

References

Greece